Ye Zhengda (22 August 1927 – 14 December 2017) was a Chinese aircraft designer and lieutenant general of the People's Liberation Army Air Force. He was also an adjunct professor and senior engineer at Northwestern Polytechnical University. He was a member of the 10th National Congress of the Chinese Communist Party and a delegate to the 5th National People's Congress.

Biography

Ye was born Ye Funong on 22 August 1927 in Shanghai, with his ancestral home in Huiyang, Guangdong. He was the first of nine children of the famous general Ye Ting and his wife Li Xiuwen, who both died in a plane crash in 1946. His siblings included Ye Zhengming (1931–2003), Ye Huaming (born 1935), Ye Jianmei (1937–1993), Ye Yangmei (1936–1946), Ye Zhengguang (born 1939), and Ye Qiguang (born 1942).

In 1947, Ye attended a Russian-language school in northeastern China founded by the Northeast Democratic United Army. He joined the Chinese Communist Party in the following year. He graduated from Moscow Aviation Institute in 1955, where he majored in aircraft production.

In August 1956, China established its first aircraft design office at Shenyang Aircraft Corporation, with Xu Shunshou as director. Ye Zhengda and Huang Zhiqian were appointed deputy directors. He participated in the design of China's first trainer jet, the Shenyang JJ-1.

He later served as deputy dean of the Six Research Institute of the PRC Ministry of National Defense, deputy director of Defense Industry of the State Council of the People's Republic of China, deputy director of the Science and Technology Committee of the Commission for Science, Technology and Industry for National Defense, and director of the 2nd and 3rd Chinese Society of Aeronautics and Astronautics. He was awarded the military rank of lieutenant general (zhongjiang) in 1988. He retired in 1998.

On December 14, 2017, he died in Beijing.

Personal life
Ye Zhengda married Ren Yue, an actress of the August First Film Studio, in Moscow.

Awards
 Special Prize of the National Prize for Progress in Science and Technology
 Second Prize of the National Prize for Progress in Science and Technology
 First Prize for Military Scientific Research Achievements of the People's Liberation Army (PLA)
 Second Prize of Military Scientific Research Achievements of the People's Liberation Army (PLA)
 1998 - Victory Medal

References

1927 births
2017 deaths
Chinese aircraft designers
Moscow Aviation Institute alumni
Academic staff of the Northwestern Polytechnical University
People's Liberation Army generals from Shanghai
Engineers from Shanghai
People's Liberation Army Air Force generals